Bill Sweeney (2 June 1914 – 13 July 1973) was a former Australian rules footballer who played with Melbourne in the Victorian Football League (VFL).

Notes

External links 

1914 births
Australian rules footballers from Victoria (Australia)
Melbourne Football Club players
1973 deaths